In algebra and algebraic geometry, given a commutative Noetherian ring  and an ideal  in it, the n-th symbolic power of  is the ideal

We have:  and if  is a maximal ideal, then .

Symbolic powers induce the following chain of ideals:

Uses 
The study and use of symbolic powers has a long history in commutative algebra. Krull’s famous proof of his principal ideal theorem uses them in an essential way. They first arose after primary decompositions were proved for Noetherian rings. Zariski used symbolic powers in his study of the analytic normality of algebraic varieties. Chevalley's famous lemma comparing topologies states that in a complete local domain the symbolic powers topology of any prime is finer than the m-adic topology. This important property of being cofinal was further developed by Schenzel in the 1970s.

In algebraic geometry 
But in the geometric setting, there is a clear geometric interpretation in the case when  is a radical ideal over an algebraically closed field of characteristic zero.

Or equivalently, if  is the maximal ideal for a point , .

Theorem (Nagata, Zariski) Let  be a prime ideal in a polynomial ring  over an algebraically closed field. Then

This result can be extended to any radical ideal. This formulation is very useful because, in characteristic zero, we can compute the differential powers in terms of generators as:

For another formulation, we can consider the case when the base ring is a polynomial ring over a field. In this case, we can interpret the n-th symbolic power as the sheaf of all function germs over 
In fact, if  is a smooth variety over a perfect field, then

Containments 
It is natural to consider whether or not symbolic powers agree with ordinary powers, i.e. does  hold? In general this is not the case. One example of this is the prime ideal . Here we have that .  However,  does hold and the generalization of this inclusion is well understood. Indeed, the containment follows from the definition. Further, it is known that  if and only if . The proof follows from Nakayama's lemma.

There has been extensive study into the other containment, when symbolic powers are contained in ordinary powers of ideals, referred to as the Containment Problem. Once again this has an easily stated answer summarized in the following theorem. It was developed by Ein, Lazarfeld, and Smith in characteristic zero  and was expanded to positive characteristic by Hochster and Huneke. Their papers both build upon the results of Irena Swanson in Linear Equivalence of Ideal Topologies (2000).

Theorem  (Ein, Lazarfeld, Smith; Hochster, Huneke) Let  be a homogeneous ideal. Then the inclusion
  holds for all 
However, following a question posed by Bocci, Harbourne, and Huneke, it was discovered that a better bound exists in some cases.

Theorem The inclusion  for all  holds 
 for arbitrary ideals in characteristic 2;
 for monomial ideals in arbitrary characteristic 
 for ideals of d-stars 
 for ideals of general points in

References

External links
 Melvin Hochster, Math 711: Lecture of September 7, 2007

Algebra